Mossley Hill is a suburb of Liverpool and a Liverpool City Council ward. Located to the south of the city, it is bordered by Aigburth, Allerton, Childwall, and Wavertree. At the 2001 Census, the population was 12,650, increasing to 13,816 at the 2011 Census.

The Mossley Hill has a highest elevation of 63m, the location of which is the Mossley Hill Parish Church on the corner of Rose Lane and Mossley Hill North Road.

Penny Lane
Mossley Hill was made famous in 1967 thanks to the Beatles' song "Penny Lane", written about a Mossley Hill street of the same name. The street runs between Allerton Road and Greenbank Road and receives thousands of annual tourist visits.

Notable residents
 Kim Cattrall, actress, born in Mossley Hill and raised there for three months
 J. Bruce Ismay, director of the White Star Line and Titanic survivor
 Charles Lawrence, Chairman of the Liverpool & Manchester Railway, lived in Carnatic Hall
 Danielle Lloyd, model and former Miss Great Britain, raised on Penny Lane
 Freddie Mercury, singer, lived in the flat above the Dovedale Towers pub for a short period in 1969; he was still known as Farrokh Bulsara at the time and was in local band Ibex
 Derek Nimmo, actor, sang in the local parish church choir
 Steven Pienaar, former footballer for Everton
 Darci Shaw, actress
 The Rathbone family, shipowners
 Russell Pritchard, musician, bassist of The Zutons and Noel Gallagher's High Flying Birds
 Richard Kemp CBE, Liberal Democrat Councillor, Leader of the Liberal Democrat Group.
 Erica Kemp CBE, former Liberal Democrat Councillor and Lord Mayor of Liverpool (2014-2015).

Education
The suburb is home to Dovedale Primary School. This was the school of notable Liverpudlians George Harrison, John Lennon, Peter Sissons, Jimmy Tarbuck and John Power. Calderstones School (which Lennon attended in its previous incarnation, Quarry Bank) is located on nearby Harthill Road. In turn, this is located near the city's police horse training centre, just north of Mossley Hill's main residential area. Liverpool College (which was until 2013 a fee-paying independent school) is also located within the area, and Liverpool's only grammar school the Liverpool Blue Coat School is also nearby.

The area is also home to the Greenbank Halls of Residence and now closed Carnatic Halls of Residence student accommodation complexes (belonging to the University of Liverpool). The Greenbank Village complex consists of redeveloped Halls including Derby and Rathbone Hall and Roscoe and Gladstone Hall: commonly known as D&R and R&G. The former Carnatic Halls site at Mossley Hill on Elmswood Road was the largest of the University of Liverpool's accommodation complexes: Morton House, Lady Mountford House, Lichen Grove, McNair Hall, Salisbury Hall and Rankin Hall.  Dale Hall was demolished in 2019 and now is redeveloped as a housing complex.

Parks
Mossley Hill is home to Greenbank Park, one of the most popular parks in Liverpool. Two more of the city's most popular parks, Sefton Park and Calderstones Park, are also nearby.

The Millennium Green, accessed from Penny Lane or Oakdale Road is a small popular green space including wild flower fields and woods, and is a popular dog walking area.

Art
Sudley House is one of seven museums and art galleries run by National Museums Liverpool, displaying paintings by Gainsborough and Turner, among others.

Transport
Mossley Hill railway station on Rose Lane offers regular services to Liverpool city centre (an approx 11 minute journey time), Warrington (27 minute journey) and Manchester Oxford Road (a 57-minute journey). There are connections to Birmingham via Liverpool South Parkway.

Buses outside the railway station route as follows:-
 61 - Aigburth and Bootle
 80A - Liverpool city centre or Speke and Liverpool John Lennon Airport
 201 Royal Liverpool Hospital or Speke

Buses from Penny Lane / Allerton Road route as follows:-
 62 to Bootle
 68 from Aigburth to Bootle
 75 and 76 from the city centre to Halewood
 80 and 80A
 86 and 86A from the city centre to Garston and Liverpool Airport

Services 80A and 86A are the only bus services that connect Mossley Hill with the airport.

The 699 service runs from the Greenbank Halls of Residence (University of Liverpool) on Greenbank Road to the University of Liverpool on Mount Pleasant/Brownlow Hill.

Government
The district lies on the border of two Parliamentary constituencies; Liverpool, Riverside and Liverpool Wavertree. It is represented on Liverpool City Council by councillors from Mossley Hill ward itself and it is in parts of Greenbank and Church wards.

Healthcare
Spire Hospital Liverpool (formerly Lourdes Hospital) on Greenbank Road is Liverpool's first private hospital. The hospital faces Greenbank Park.

Sport
Mossley Hill Athletic Club are a voluntary multi sports club. They offer facilities for archery, crown green bowling, cricket, football, rugby, hockey, running and tennis.

The district has a women's football team, Mossley Hill L.F.C., who play in the Northern Combination Women's Football League.

Retail and nightlife
Penny Lane Wine Bar is a pub on Penny Lane. The area of Rose Lane and Allerton Road contains a large number of wine bars, bistros, and restaurants. These two streets are the area's principal centres for retail, hosting numerous shops and offices.

Olive and Grape Bistro, based on Rose Lane is a popular destination for ‘foodies’, with their fresh food approach, celebrating seasonality.

The Dovedale Towers pub stands on the corner of Dovedale Road and Penny Lane. It was closed for business in 2010 and reopened in 2012.

Architecture
Mossley Hill is considered an affluent area. It is mostly residential with a few local businesses scattered around the district. Housing is mainly semi-detached, with occasional detached and numerous terraced streets. The area around Sefton Park has many large Victorian villas.

Places of worship
Most of the churches in Mossley Hill are members of "Churches Together in Mossley Hill", a covenanted group of churches. This group was known as "The Nine Churches of Mossley Hill" until it reformed with one new member under the new membership covenant in 1994.

The original nine member churches comprised three Anglican parishes: St Matthew and St James, St Barnabas, and All Hallows, Allerton; two Roman Catholic parishes: Our Lady of the Annunciation, Bishop Eton and St Anthony of Padua and four Free Churches: Dovedale Baptist Church, Allerton United Reformed, Elm Hall Drive Methodist and Bethel Presbyterian Church in Wales. The tenth church was Dove Community Church, which ceased to exist in 2006 and at the same time was replaced in membership of Churches Together by Wavertree Christian Fellowship.

There is at least one more church in Mossley Hill not in membership of Churches Together: Ramilies Road Chapel. There is also a mosque in the area, the Islamic Institute on Cramond Avenue.

References

External links

 2006 Liverpool City Council, Ward Profile: Mossley Hill
 Liverpool Street Gallery - Liverpool 18

Areas of Liverpool